Smethurst is a surname. Notable people with the surname include:

Adam Smethurst, English actor and writer
Allan Smethurst (1927–2000), aka The Singing Postman, English folk singer and postman
Annika Smethurst (born 1987), Australian journalist.
Becky Smethurst, British astrophysicist, author, and YouTuber
Daniel Smethurst (born 1990), English tennis player
Derek Smethurst (born 1947), retired South African soccer forward
Gamaliel Smethurst (1738–1826), American-born author and politician in Nova Scotia
Jack Smethurst (1932–2022), English TV and film comic actor
Justine Smethurst (born 1987), Australian softball player
Michael Smethurst (born 1976), English cricketer
Richard Smethurst (born 1941), Provost of Worcester College, Oxford, England

See also
Mount Smethurst, prominent mountain in Enderby Land
Simone Thust